The following is a list of structures built on top of freeways, which may include freeway lids, parks, buildings, monuments, and parking garages.

Germany
Autobahnüberbauung Schlangenbader Straße, Berlin Wilmdersdorf

Schlangenbader Straße (snake)

The complex at Schlangenbader Straße 23-36 was built from 1976 to 1980. A particularly good infrastructure is ensured by the A 104 motorway, bus, underground and S-Bahn connections.

Up to 46 meters high, the seven residential hills of Schlangenbader Straße tower over the city. The connected apartment blocks (1,215 residential units) have a total length of 1.5 kilometers and were built as a superstructure directly above the four-lane motorway A 104. Nevertheless, there is no noise here. On the contrary, in the Schlangenbader Straße, it is quiet and green in the middle of the big city.

Italy
A1: In Cantagallo, Tuscany, an Auto-grill restaurant is built as an overpass across the highway. Diners have a view of the traffic below as they eat.

Japan
The Gate Tower Building is a 16-story office building in Fukushima-ku, Osaka, Japan. The tenant of floors five through seven is the Umeda Exit of the Ikeda Route of the Hanshin Expressway system.

United States

Arizona
Margaret T. Hance Park and parts of the Burton Barr Central Library sit above Interstate 10 in Phoenix, Arizona.

California 
Memorial Park sits above the I-210 freeway in La Cañada Flintridge.
The Presidio Parkway in San Francisco features two landscaped connections over US-101.

Connecticut
Conlin-Whitehead Highway, Hartford: The Hartford Public Library is built on a cap over the Conlin-Whitehead Highway extending from Main Street to Prospect Street.

District of Columbia
Interstate 395: The National Mall runs directly over Interstate 395.
Capitol Crossing:  A 7 acre commercial development built on a three block long deck over Interstate 395.

Georgia

Interstate 75/85 (Downtown Connector), Atlanta: The Civic Center MARTA station is located over the Downtown Connector at West Peachtree Street, making it the only subway station built over an Interstate Highway. 
Interstate 285, Atlanta: The fifth runway of Hartsfield-Jackson Atlanta International Airport runs above the interstate near Interstate 85.
 Georgia State Route 400 also in Atlanta: Atlanta Financial Center straddles the roadway.

Illinois
Illinois Tollway oases, multiple locations and Interstate Highways: Rest areas which extend over the Interstate Highway. There are six oases, located on the Tri-State Tollway (I-80, I-94 and I-294), Jane Addams Memorial Tollway (Interstate 90 in Illinois) and the Ronald Reagan Memorial Tollway (I-88). The four on the Tri-State Tollway and the one on the Jane Addams Memorial Tollway are built over the roadway, while the DeKalb Oasis on the Ronald Reagan Memorial Tollway is on the south side of the roadway.  Customers are able to sit inside the oases and eat while traffic goes by beneath them. This type of development is common in the United Kingdom.
I-290 has a former U.S Post Office over it. The building existed first and was designed to accommodate a future road through it, which was ultimately built in the 1950s as the Congress Expressway (now the Eisenhower Expressway). Google Street View

Kentucky
Interstate 64, just before the Kennedy Interchange, passes under Riverfront Plaza/Belvedere. The Belvedere is an  plaza with a concert stage, view of the Ohio River and Louisville's skyline, as well as a fountain and bronze statue of George Rogers Clark. Aerial image

Massachusetts
Interstate 90, Boston: The Prudential Tower and Copley Place are built over I-90, with Fenway Center and Parcel 12 both under construction.
Interstate 90, Newton: a Shaw's supermarket and a Four Points by Sheraton hotel are built over the highway.
Interstate 195, Fall River: Government Center is built above the freeway.

Michigan
Interstate 696 (Walter P. Reuther Freeway) is capped in three different locations with parks at ground level as it passes through Oak Park and Southfield.USGS Aerial photograph @ Google
M-10 (John C. Lodge Freeway) in Detroit passes beneath Cobo Center, Detroit's expo and convention center.

Minnesota
Interstate 394, Minneapolis: Three parking garages that were funded as part of the U.S. Route 12 improvement are constructed above the Eastern terminus of the road. They are the Seventh street ramp, Fifth Street Ramp, and Fourth Street Ramp.
Interstate 35 through downtown and near northeast Duluth, among America's earliest and more advanced covered freeway projects. Completed in 1992, with four beautiful park sections over the course of one mile, paralleling the accompanying Lake Superior Lakewalk.  In downtown, an elevated, highly landscaped plaza section includes sweeping views of Lake Superior, with a second section just to the Northeast accommodating both the major downtown Superior St thoroughfare as well as the historic Fitgers shopping & hotel complex. The third section serves the historic Kitchi Gammi Club, a strip of historic shops and businesses, and portions of London Road, providing parking as well as green space. The fourth, largest section helps preserve the historic lakeside Erickson Park. This section also features a 4.5 acre rose garden looking out on Lake Superior.

Missouri
Interstate 670, Kansas City: The Bartle Hall Convention Center extends over the freeway in downtown Kansas City. Aerial image
Interstate 64, St. Louis: A large bridge-like structure connects two ends of the Saint Louis Science Center. People walking through the structure can see cars going by, and use radar guns to measure their speed. Also, cars driving below can see the atmospheric condition of the general area every morning, as it is posted on an electronic sign on the side. Aerial image
Interstate 44, St. Louis: A pedestrian bridge over the interstate connects two buildings on the Maritz corporate campus

Nebraska
Interstate 80, Kearney: The Great Platte River Road Archway Monument, a 1,500-ton structure spanning 308 feet (93.87 m), houses a museum dedicated to frontier culture.

Nevada
Interstate 80, Reno: A Walgreens store sits on top of a segment of Interstate 80 in downtown Reno. Aerial image

New York
FDR Drive: Along the eastern banks of Manhattan in New York City, numerous parks and buildings were constructed atop FDR Parkway, most notably Battery Park, Carl Schurz Park, and the United Nations Headquarters.
Interstate 95, New York: The segment between the George Washington Bridge and the Harlem River is covered by the Bridge Apartments, a parking lot and the George Washington Bridge Bus Terminal.
South Mall Arterial: In downtown Albany, the Governor Nelson A. Rockefeller Empire State Plaza was built atop the South Mall Arterial.
Hutchinson River Parkway: Herbert H. Lehman High School is built over the parkway at East Tremont Avenue.

Ohio

Interstate 670, Columbus:  A portion of High Street that passes over 10 lanes of the Interstate just north of downtown Columbus is capped and bordered by buildings housing several stores.  The design of the buildings borrowed from the old Union Station terminal that once stood at the site.
Interstate 71, Cincinnati:  Several low-rise apartment buildings and Lytle Park are located above a  tunnel that carries I-71 through Downtown Cincinnati connecting it to Fort Washington Way

Oklahoma

 The Will Rogers Turnpike (I-44):  The world's largest McDonald's is built over the turnpike near Vinita, Oklahoma, about three miles east of the mainline toll plaza.

Pennsylvania 

 I-95, Philadelphia: I-95 Park, Philadelphia Korean War Memorial Park, and Philadelphia War Veterans Memorial Park all sit atop I-95 near downtown.
 I-676, Philadelphia: Shakespeare and Vine Street Parks.

Texas

 Woodall Rodgers Freeway, Dallas: Klyde Warren Park.

Virginia
Interstate 66, Arlington: The parking garage next to Washington-Liberty High School is built over top of 66 which is trenched at this point so as to reduce the noise levels in surrounding neighborhoods.
Interstate 564, Norfolk: The runway of NAS Norfolk-Chambers Field passes directly over the western end of I-564. A C-5 Galaxy (the largest military aircraft in the western world) once got stuck on the overpass and motorists could view the gigantic aircraft as they drove underneath.
Downtown Expressway, Richmond: Kanawa Plaza was built over the 195 toll road to reconnect the city's business district to the James River. The 3 acre plaza features a large, sunken pool, an open air venue and tree covered areas for smaller groups. It was conceived in 1972, completed in 1980 and renovated in 2016.

Washington

Interstate 5, Seattle: Freeway Park sits on top of Interstate 5, which connects downtown to the Capitol Hill and First Hill districts. The park is multi-level and as such, there are areas where visitors are able to watch traffic pass by. The park is connected to the Washington State Convention Center which is also built on top of I-5.
Interstate 90, Mercer Island: the Aubrey Davis Park sits atop the Mercer Island Lid.
Interstate 705: Fireman's Park in downtown Tacoma sits atop the southbound lanes of Interstate 705.
Washington State Route 520, Eastside: Three parks on lids in Yarrow Point and Clyde Hill, of which two also have bus stations in the median.

Wisconsin
Interstate 43, Milwaukee: The Milwaukee County Courthouse is built over Exit 72C.
U.S. Route 151, Madison: The Monona Terrace Community and Convention Center is built over a section in Downtown Madison.

References

Freeway
Interstate Highway System